Meghan Schroeder (born 1986) is an American politician. She worked for Bernie O'Neill, and succeeded him in office as a member of the Pennsylvania House of Representatives in 2019, representing District 29.

Education
Schroeder graduated from Central Bucks High School East in 2004, and completed a bachelor's degree in political science at Millersville University in 2008.

Political career
Schroeder worked for Bernie O'Neill throughout his sixteen-year tenure as a member of the Pennsylvania House of Representatives. Schroeder replaced O'Neill as the Republican Party candidate for House District 29 in August 2018, after O'Neill decided to end his bid for reelection. Schroeder defeated Democratic Party candidate Andrew Dixon. She won a party primary in 2020, against Greg Archetto. In the general election, Schroeder faced Marlene Katz, the Democratic Party candidate. Schroeder defeated Katz, and won reelection by approximately 6,000 votes.

Committee assignments 

 Appropriations
 Education, Secretary
 Gaming Oversight
 Transportation, Subcommittee on Ports - Chair

References

1986 births
Living people
Women state legislators in Pennsylvania
Republican Party members of the Pennsylvania House of Representatives
21st-century American politicians
21st-century American women politicians
People from Bucks County, Pennsylvania
Millersville University of Pennsylvania alumni